The 1999 GP Miguel Induráin was the 46th edition of the GP Miguel Induráin cycle race and was held on 3 April 1999. The race started and finished in Estella. The race was won by Stefano Garzelli.

General classification

References

1999
1999 in Spanish road cycling